The discography of Alphabeat, a Danish pop group, consists of four studio albums, six extended plays and 18 singles.

Studio albums

Extended plays

Singles

Music videos

Notes
A. "Sometimes 2020" is a remix of 2019 song "Sometimes." It does not feature on any official releases.
B. "Danmarks Dynamite" marks the band's first time singing in their native language. It serves as the official Danish song for the postponed 2020 UEFA Championship.
C. Whilst a video for "Sing a Song" was created, the song itself has not been released as a single.

References

Discographies of Danish artists
Pop music group discographies